A crooked spire, (also known as a twisted spire) is a tower showing a twist and/or a deviation from the vertical. A church tower usually consists of a square stone tower topped with a pyramidal wooden structure, the spire is usually cladded with slates or lead to protect the wood. Through accident or design the spire may contain a twist, or it may not point perfectly straight upwards.  Some however have been built or rebuilt with a deliberate twist, generally as a design choice.

There are about a hundred bell towers of this type in Europe.

Reasons for spires to twist and bend
Twisting can be caused by internal or external forces. Internal conditions, such as green or unseasoned wood, can cause some twisting until after about 50 years when fully seasoned. Also the weight of any lead  used in construction can cause the wood to twist. Dry wood will shrink, causing further movement.

External forces, such as water ingress that causes rot, can cause partial collapse, resulting in tilting. Heat from the sun on one side can also cause movement. Earthquakes have also occasionally caused twisting. Subsidence can cause leaning. Strong winds have been blamed at times, but there is little evidence to back this up.  Finally, weak design can be at fault, for instance with a lack of cross-bracing, resulting in the ability of the tower to move.

One legend relating to Chesterfield says that a virgin once married in the church, and the church was so surprised that the spire turned around to look at the bride. Another version of the myth common in Chesterfield is that the devil twisted the spire when a virgin married in the church, saying that he would untwist it when the next virgin got married there. A third myth says that the devil perched on the spire and twisted his tail around it to hold on, the twist of his tail transmitting to the structure.

List of twisted spires

References

Towers